2010 ACC tournament may refer to:

 2010 ACC men's basketball tournament
 2010 ACC women's basketball tournament
 2010 ACC men's soccer tournament
 2010 ACC women's soccer tournament
 2010 Atlantic Coast Conference baseball tournament
 2010 Atlantic Coast Conference softball tournament